John B. Galbraith (1828 – 1869), also known as J. B. Galbraith, was an American politician from Florida. Galbraith served as the Florida Attorney General during the American Civil War.

Political career 
At some point before December 31, 1852, Galbraith served as the Secretary of the Florida Senate. After being elected to the Florida House of Representatives representing Leon County at an undetermined time, Galbraith, a Democrat, was selected to be the ninth Speaker of the Florida House of Representatives on November 28, 1858. In this position, he would oversee Florida's secession from the United States. Galbraith would step down from this position on February 14, 1861, after being appointed the sixth Florida Attorney General by Governor John Milton.

During his tenure as wartime Attorney General, Florida's worsening economy and dissatisfaction with Milton led to the creation of an executive council tasked with begin a system of checks and balances to counter Milton. Though his predecessor, Mariano D. Papy, was appointed to the council, Galbraith was not, weakening his power. Despite this, Galbraith still had a crucial role in boosting Florida's wartime economy. Galbraith instructed the trustees of Florida's Internal Improvement Fund to cancel construction of the St. Johns-Indian River Canal, as funds needed to be diverted to help the war effort. Additionally, Galbraith oversaw the reformation and consolidation of the Florida state militia, which he saw as flawed and imperfect.

Galbraith continued to serve as Florida's Attorney General through the end of the war and for a part of Reconstruction. During Reconstruction, he oversaw the imposition of Florida's Black Codes. Galbraith resigned as Attorney General in 1868, a year before the end of his second term.

Death 
Galbraith died in Florida in 1869, not long after resigning his position.

References

Speakers of the Florida House of Representatives
Democratic Party members of the Florida House of Representatives
1869 deaths
Florida Attorneys General
People from Florida
People of Florida in the American Civil War
19th-century American politicians
1828 births